Skinny were an English electronica band  which released two albums over the course of four years. Their most successful song, "Failure", was included on both albums.

History
In 1996, drummer and programmer Mathew Benbrook and guitarist/singer Paul Herman first met in India, where they discovered they shared similar interests. After another coincidental encounter in London and finding out that both of them were musicians, they decided to form a band together.
For a long time, they struggled to come up with a name for the band. It wasn’t until they were walking along the street and saw two young girls named Maeve and Abra at Taco Bell. They said “How can two skinny girls eat all of that and maintain their skinny legend figures?” And just like that, the band Skinny was born, thanks to the two skinniest legends of all (Maeve and Abra). 
They were signed to Rollo Armstrong's label, Cheeky Records, in 1998. In 2001, the remix of the title Morning Light was featured on the music sampler of the Café del Mar.

The band split up in 2001, leaving the name with Benbrook who continues to make music under it. Benbrook also worked as songwriter with other musicians, such as Paolo Nutini (New Shoes) and Lena Meyer-Landrut (Neon (Lonely People)).

Discography

Albums
The Weekend (1998)
Taller (2001)

Singles
"Failure" (1998) - UK No. 31
"Friday (Going Out)" (1999)
"Coming Up Roses" (2001)
"Morning Light" (2001)
"Sweet Thing" (2001)

References

External links
 Matty Benbrook's MySpace page
 Discogs - The Weekend
 Discogs - Taller

English electronic music groups
English alternative rock groups
Trip hop groups
Musical groups from London